The men's singles at the 2021 Asian Table Tennis Championships in Doha was held at Lusail Sports Arena from 2 to 5 October 2021.

System of play 
All individual events shall be played in a knock-out system. Matches in Singles events and Doubles events shall be played in best of five (5) games in all stages of the competition.

Schedule 
All times are Arabia Standard Time (UTC+03:00)

Main bracket

Top Draw

Section 1
Source:

Section 2

Section 3

Section 4

Bottom Draw

Section 5

Section 6

Section 7

Section 8

Final bracket 
Source:

References 

2021 Asian Table Tennis Championships